Buchenwald is the German for "beechwood forest". It may also refer to:

Buchenwald concentration camp, a German concentration camp in World War II
Buchenhochwald, a forest in the Elm hills in Lower Saxony, Germany
A German name for the Hungarian region Bakony Forest
Buchenwald (album), 1981 album by the band Whitehouse
Kibbutz Buchenwald, the original name of Netzer Sereni.

See also
Buchwald